The Atlas of the Imperium is a 1984 tabletop role-playing game supplement for Traveller, written by Marc W. Miller, with a cover by Steve Ventners, and published by Game Designers' Workshop. One of the classic Traveller Modules series.

Contents
The Atlas of the Imperium is a comprehensive star-chart of the Third Imperium and nearby sections.

Reception
Craig Sheeley reviewed The Atlas of the Imperium in Space Gamer No. 73. Sheeley commented that "Atlas of the Imperium is a major disappointment. Unless the game stats for the systems presented in this supplement are published, you may as well populate the Imperium yourself and save the money."

Reviews
 Different Worlds #42 (May/June, 1986)

See also
Classic Traveller Modules

References

Role-playing game supplements introduced in 1984
Traveller (role-playing game) supplements